Lake tankers were small (up to 5,000 ton) specially designed shallow-draft tanker ships that carried the crude oil, pumped from beneath Lake Maracaibo in Venezuela, to the three off-shore refineries located on the Dutch islands of Aruba and Curaçao.

Background 
The crude obtained from Lake Maracaibo was processed at refineries located at Aruba and Curaçao, Netherlands West Indies. Aruba had two refineries, Lago Oil and Transport Company, owned by Standard Oil of New Jersey and Eagle, owned by Royal Dutch Shell.  There was also a Royal Dutch Shell refinery on the island of Curaçao. The Lago refinery housed the officers and their families in Lago Colony, a community owned by the company which housed all their foreign staff employees.

All three refineries depended on a fleet of "Lake Tankers" to supply the crude to be refined, carried from Lake Maracaibo through the shallow cannel between it and the Caribbean Sea. This shallow passage prevented larger oceanic tanker ships from entering the lake, and thus the need for the smaller Lake tanker.

Description 

The Lake Tanker was a small vessel in comparison with the larger ocean-going oil tankers; it had a trunk deck hull with a very shallow draft and a flat bottom, which allowed the ship to maneuver over the ever shifting sand bars that blocked the channel going into Lake Maracaibo.

History 

The first Lake Tankers (SS Invercorrie, SS Inverampton, and SS Francunion) were built in England around 1923, entering service in 1924. These were followed in 1926 by 4 ships of the Invercaibo class, significantly larger than the former. Subsequent ships remained small until after World War II when, with the dredging of the channel to Lake Maracaibo, the lake tankers became larger.

This collection of small tankers was known as the "Lake fleet" or the "Mosquito fleet", which peaked at more than 60 ships, either owned or chartered. This type of tanker was no longer needed after the channel from Lake Maracaibo to the sea was finally dredged and deepened to allow ocean-going tankers to enter the lake, and pipelines from the lake were constructed to deep water ports in the Paraguana Peninsula.
 
The last Lake Tanker, SS Trujillo, was retired from service in December 1954 and sailed to Jacksonville, Florida, where it joined another 12 decommissioned Lake tankers that had been active as of January 1954.

Lake fleet 

Some tankers that have been part of the "Lake fleet" are listed below.

Lago Oil fleet 
 SS Invercorrie
 SS Inverampton
 SS Francunion
 SS Oranjestad
 SS Ambrosio
 SS Bachaquero
 SS Invercaibo
 SS Hooiberg
 SS Invergoil
 SS Punta Gorda
 SS San Carlos
 SS Tia Juana
 SS Yamanota
 SS Pedernales
 SS Andino
 SS Quiriquire
 SS Misoa
 SS Cumarebo
 SS Maracay
 SS Boscan
 SS Caripito
 SS Guarico
 SS Temblador
 SS Amacuro
 SS Mara
 SS Trujillo

Shell Oil fleet 

 SS Adela
 SS Alicia
 SS Asiento
 SS Berta
 SS Brigida
 SS Carlota
 SS Casandra
 SS Chepita
 SS Conchita
 SS Dolium
 SS Elena
 SS Felipa
 SS Frasca
 SS Gadinia
 SS Galeomma
 SS Ganesella
 SS Gari
 SS Gastrana
 SS Gaza
 SS Gemma
 SS Gena
 SS Genota
 SS Geomitra
 SS Glebula
 SS Glessula
 SS Gomphina
 SS Gouldia
 SS Gyrotoma
 SS Josefina
 SS Juanita
 SS Juliana
 SS Julieta
 SS Justina
 SS Laura
 SS Leona
 SS Leonor
 SS Leticia
 SS Lidia
 SS Linda
 SS Liria
 SS Liseta
 SS Lucia
 SS Lucita
 SS Lucrecia
 SS Luisa
 SS Manuela
 SS Mariana
 SS Mariquita
 SS Marsella
 SS Martica
 SS Martina
 SS Maruja
 SS Matilde
 SS Maximina
 SS Rafaela
 SS Ramona
 SS Rebeca
 SS Renata
 SS Rita
 SS Rodas
 SS Rosa
 SS Rosalia
 SS Rosaura
 SS Rufina
 Shell Aramare
 Shell Caricuao
 Shell Charaima
 Shell Dezoito
 Shell Manaure
 Shell Mara
 Shell Murachi
 Shell Naiguata
 Shell Plata
 SS Shellphalte
 SS Shellspra
 SS Spramex
 SS Susana

British American Oil fleet 
(see British-American Oil)
 B/A Peerless
 B/A Canada

Footnotes

References

External links
A story about Lago's Lake Tankers 
History of Lago Oil Shipping Co., Ltd. 
Lago Colony & Lago Refinery with links to Lake Tanker photos
 Helder Line website, List of Shell Lake Tankers  (accessed 2015-02-15)
 Auke Visser's website, A story about Lago Oil tankers (accessed 2015-02-15)
 Auke Visser's website, Lago / Creole Petroleum Corp., list of all their ships with link to individual stories (accessed 2015-02-21)
 The Ships List website,  Andrew Weir & Co. / Bank Line (accessed 2015-02-16)
 Harland and Wolff shipyard website, ship search page (accessed 2015-02-17)

+
 
History of Venezuela